Area codes 760 and 442 are telephone area codes in the North American Numbering Plan (NANP) for the U.S. state of California. These area codes serve an overlay numbering plan area (NPA) that comprises much of the southeastern and southernmost portions of California. It includes Imperial, Inyo, and Mono counties, as well as portions of San Diego, Riverside, San Bernardino, Los Angeles and Kern counties. Area code 760 was created on March 22, 1997 in a split of area code 619. Area code 442 was added to the same area on November 21, 2009.

History
Area code 760 was split from 619 in 1997, which in turn had been split from area code 714 in 1982. Within a decade of its creation, however, the proliferation of cell phones and pagers left 760 strained to the point that a new area code was needed for the area. The initial plan was a further area code split, with the San Diego and Imperial portions moving to a new 442 area code. However, this met with protests from businesses who did not want to change their numbers for the second time in a decade. Ultimately, the California Public Utilities Commission decided that 442 would be added as an overlay to 760 instead, and since 2009 all users in the region have been required to include the area code even when dialing local calls.

At , it is the largest area code in California with approximately 29% of the state served by area codes 760 and 442.

Manual service
Areas within this area code which had manual service in the past include:

 Death Valley Junction (Inyo County)
 Kelso (San Bernardino County)
 Stovepipe Wells, Death Valley (Inyo County)

Rate centers
 Rate centers located in area codes 442/760:

Imperial County

Andrade
Bombay Beach
Brawley
Calexico
Calipatria
Desert Shores
El Centro
Heber
Holtville
Imperial
Mount Signal
Niland
Ocotillo
Ogilby
Palo Verde
Plaster City
Salton City
Salton Sea Beach
Seeley
Westmorland
Winterhaven

Inyo County

 Ballarat
 Big Pine
 Bishop
 Cartago
 Darwin
 Death Valley Junction
 Dixon Lane-Meadow Creek
 Furnace Creek
 Homewood Canyon-Valley Wells
 Independence
 Keeler
 Laws
 Lone Pine
 Mesa
 Olancha
 Panamint Springs
 Pearsonville
 Round Valley
 Shoshone
 Tecopa
 West Bishop
 Wilkerson

Kern County

 Bodfish
 Boron
 California City
 Cantil
 China Lake Acres
 Inyokern
 Johannesburg
 Kernville
 Lake Isabella
 Mountain Mesa
 Onyx
 Randsburg
 Ridgecrest
 South Lake
 Squirrel Mountain Valley
 Weldon
 Wofford Heights

Los Angeles County

 Big Pines
 Jackson Lake

Mono County

 Benton
 Bodie
 Bridgeport
 Chalfant
 Coleville
 Lee Vining
 Mammoth Lakes
 Swall Meadows

Riverside County

 Bermuda Dunes
 Blythe
 Cathedral City
 Chiriaco Summit
 Coachella
 Desert Center
 Desert Hot Springs
 Eagle Mountain
 East Blythe
 Indian Wells
 Indio
 La Quinta
 Lost Lake
 Mecca
 North Shore
 Palm Desert
 Palm Springs
 Rancho Mirage
 Ripley
 Sun City Palm Desert
 Thermal
 Thousand Palms
 White Water

San Bernardino County

 Adelanto
 Amboy
 Apple Valley
 Bagdad
 Baker
 Barstow
 Big River
 Bluewater
 Cadiz
 Calico
 Chambless
 Cima
 Daggett
 Earp
 Essex
 Fort Irwin
 Goffs
 Halloran Springs
 Helendale
 Hesperia
 Hinkley
 Joshua Tree
 Kelso
 Landers
 Lenwood
 Lucerne Valley
 Ludlow
 Twentynine Palms Marine Base
 Morongo Valley
 Mountain View Acres
 Nebo Center
 Needles
 Newberry Springs
 Nipton
 Oro Grande
 Phelan
 Piñon Hills
 Pioneertown
 Rice
 Running Springs
 Siberia
 Sunfair Heights
 Sunfair
 Searles Valley
 Trona
 Twentynine Palms
 Victorville
 Vidal Junction
 Vidal
 Wrightwood
 Yermo
 Yucca Valley
 Zzyzx

San Diego County

 Bonsall
 Borrego Springs
 Camp Pendleton North
 Camp Pendleton South
 Carlsbad
 Encinitas
 Escondido
 Fallbrook
 Hidden Meadows
 Julian
 Lake San Marcos
 Oceanside
 Ocotillo Wells
 Pala
 Rainbow
 Ramona
 San Marcos
 Santa Ysabel
 Valley Center
 Vista

See also
List of California area codes
List of NANP area codes
North American Numbering Plan

References

 Report on the 760 Area Code by the California Public Utilities Commission, Telecommunications Division (warning: this link leads to a large PDF file)

External links

760 and 442
Imperial County, California
Inyo County, California
Mono County, California
Riverside County, California
San Bernardino County, California
San Diego County, California
Colorado Desert
Mojave Desert
Owens Valley
San Diego
Sierra Nevada (United States)
442 and 760